The White Pine County School District is the public school district of White Pine County, Nevada.

The superintendent in 2018 is Adam Young.

It includes:
White Pine High School, in Ely, Nevada
Steptoe Valley High School, Ely
White Pine Middle School, Ely
David E. Norman Elementary School, Ely
McGill Elementary School, in McGill
Baker Grade School, in Baker
Lund K-12 School, in North Lund

It operated the Lund Grade School until 2005.  Its building was listed on the National Register of Historic Places in 2018.

The high schools in Lund and Ely take students from the Duckwater area. As of 1986 students going to Ely often stay with area families who provide boarding.

References

External links
 White Pine County School District

School districts in Nevada
White Pine County, Nevada